Utricularia kamienskii is an annual terrestrial carnivorous plant that belongs to the genus Utricularia (family Lentibulariaceae). It is endemic to a few locations around Darwin in the Northern Territory.

See also 
 List of Utricularia species

References 

Carnivorous plants of Australia
Flora of the Northern Territory
kamienskii
Lamiales of Australia
Taxa named by Ferdinand von Mueller